Lieutenant General George Washington is an 1860 equestrian statue of George Washington, at Washington Circle, at the edge of the George Washington University’s campus in Washington, D.C. The statue was sculpted by Clark Mills.

History

In 1783, after the close of the American Revolutionary War, the Continental Congress ordered that an equestrian statue of Washington should be erected, the base of which should represent the principal incident of the war. For some reason the subject was dropped until after Washington's death, when in December, 1799, Congress resolved that a marble monument be erected by the United States Government. This was also, however, delayed, and in May, 1800, a third time it was decided that an erection of a costly mausoleum would resolve it. After talking, 1801, an appropriation of $800,000 was made for the purpose and the issue concerning the statue ended.

On February 13, 1832, a resolution of inquiry, introduced by Congressman (and later President) James Buchanan as to how the House resolution of 1799 had been carried out, was adopted. The House appointed a committee to make suitable arrangements for the celebration of the centennial anniversary of Washington's birth. This brought back to life the idea of creating a statue honoring George Washington.

The equestrian statue was finally authorized by an act of Congress on January 25, 1853, and executed by sculptor Clark Mills, and dedicated on February 22, 1860, by President Buchanan.
It cost $60,000.

Washington is pictured advancing in front of the American lines toward the British, with shot and cannonballs, at the Battle of Princeton and Trenton. He calmly hold the reins as he surveys the battle with unflinching determination.

The horse's mane is modeled on Napoleon Crossing the Alps. Washington's rank during the war was not "Lieutenant General," but "General and Commander-in-Chief." In 1798, during the Quasi-War, he was appointed to command the army with the rank of lieutenant general. 

After years of guarding Washington Circle for over a century, this equestrian statue was temporarily moved to allow for the construction of the K Street Underpass. In 1936, Washington and his horse were released from their wooden cage and returned to the center of the Washington Circle.

As part of American Revolution Statuary in Washington, D.C. the statue is listed on the National Register of Historic Places.

See also
 List of public art in Washington, D.C., Ward 2
 List of statues of George Washington
 List of sculptures of presidents of the United States

References

External links

 http://dcmemorials.com/index_indiv0001420.htm
"George Washington statue in Washington Circle", DC Guide
http://xenophongroup.com/patriot/washington/rank.htm

1860 sculptures
1860s establishments in Washington, D.C.
Washington, G
Bronze sculptures in Washington, D.C.
Equestrian statues in Washington, D.C.
Historic district contributing properties in Washington, D.C.
Monuments and memorials on the National Register of Historic Places in Washington, D.C.
Monuments and memorials to George Washington in the United States
Northwest (Washington, D.C.)
Sculptures of men in Washington, D.C.
Statues of George Washington